Daniel Alves (born 15 March 1969) is a Portuguese rower. He competed in the men's double sculls event at the 1992 Summer Olympics.

References

External links
 

1969 births
Living people
Portuguese male rowers
Olympic rowers of Portugal
Rowers at the 1992 Summer Olympics